Egarasindur, and historically Yarasindur, is a village in Pakundia Upazila, Kishoreganj District, Dhaka Division, Bangladesh, on the east side of the Brahmaputra River. It is in the western part of the division, about 85 km from Dhaka by road. The village is mentioned in the Akbarnama by Abu'l-Fazl ibn Mubarak. Historians disagree about the history of Egarosindur. It was believed to have been settled about 1000 BCE, and archaeological finds include silver coins, iron axes, lances, bows and arrows. At that time, the village was a commercial center.

During the eighth century CE, it was a river port where Muslims traded with Rome and Persia. In 1338 Fakhruddin Mubarak Shah took control of the region, followed by Firuz Shah Tughlaq. In 1577, Isa Khan proclaimed independence for Egarosindur as a trading center. At this time a battle took place at the Fort of Egarosindur between Isa Khan and Man Singh I, Akbar's general, in which Isa Khan was defeated. In 1638, during the reign of Shah Jahan, Egarosindur was attacked and destroyed.

Archaeology 
Notable structures include the fort, the Shah Mosque (dating to 1680), the Sadi Mosque, and the cemetery.

See also
 List of villages in Bangladesh
Pakundia Adarsha Mohila College

References

Villages in Kishoreganj District
Populated places in Dhaka Division
Villages in Dhaka Division